Harald Eriksen is the name of:

 Harald Eriksen (gymnast) (1888–1968), Norwegian gymnast
 Harald Eriksen (canoeist), Norwegian sprint canoer

See also
Harald Eriksson (1921–2015), Swedish cross-country skier
Hal Erickson (disambiguation)